General Luis Street is a two-to-four lane, major east-west thoroughfare situated in the cities of Valenzuela, North Caloocan and Quezon City. Heavy traffic is usually expected when traversing this road due to concentration of tricycles and jeepneys, commercial establishments, warehouses and factories along and near the vicinity, although there have been multiple plans to alleviate traffic congestion such as obstruction removal, road widening and improvement, and construction of additional roads like the Mindanao Avenue extension.

Name 
Once called the Polo-Novaliches Road connecting the towns of Novaliches (now mostly part of Quezon City) and Polo (now Valenzuela), this segment of the road was renamed after one of Andrés Bonifacio's most trusted revolutionaries, General Luis Malinis, who was killed during the Battle of Novaliches on November 1896. Its segment in Caloocan is also known as Kaybiga Road, apparently after the area of the same name that it traverses there.

Route description 
The road starts at the intersection with Susano Road and Quirino Highway in Novaliches Proper (also known as Novaliches Bayan), passing through various residential subdivisions, into factories and warehouses. The road then crosses the border to Kaybiga, part of North Caloocan, after passing through Mendoza Compound. The road then slopes down and meets ITC Road, where it continues towards Valenzuela as Bagbaguin Road.

Intersections

References 

Streets in Metro Manila